Baahubali 2: The Conclusion is the soundtrack of the 2017 Indian epic historical film of the same name.

Production
The original soundtrack in Telugu was composed by MM Keeravani while the songs were sung by Daler Mahendi, Mounima, Sony, Deepu, Sreenidhi, V. Srisoumya, Kaala Bhairava and Keeravani. For the Malayalam soundtrack, Mankompu Gopalakrishnan composed the lyrics while Vijay Yesudas, Shweta Mohan and Yazin Nizar sang the songs. The Hindi soundtrack featured a song by Kailash Kher.

Lahari Music acquired the audio rights of the Telugu and Tamil soundtracks in late October 2016 for an amount of ₹45 million, the highest sum paid by the company in its 37 years of operation. The audio rights of the Hindi and Malayalam soundtracks were acquired by Zee Music Company and Manorama Music respectively. The audio launch of the soundtrack, which also doubled as the pre-release event of the film, was held on 26 March 2017 at YMCA grounds  with Karan Johar as the chief guest. Among the various events that took place at the launch, Keeravani sang a song dedicated to S.S. Rajamouli, the director of the film. Due to the success of the predecessor's album,  there were expectations that the second installment of the album would also be successful.

Track lists

Background score 
All music is composed and conducted by M.M. Keeravani.

Critical reception
The Conclusion received highly positive reviews. Hemanth Kumar of Firstpost writes, "It wouldn't be an exaggeration to say that every song in the album is infused with so much emotion, pain and love that it's tough to handpick the best of the lot." Further commenting on the theme, he writes, "One of the key aspects of the album is that each song is tied to a very particular situation in the film and it's unfair to alienate the song from what it tries to convey." Bollywood Life rates the soundtrack 3.5/5 and writes, "Just as expected, MM Keeravani provides a majestic score for Baahubali 2, that suitably fits its grandeur and epicness." India-West gives a rating of 3.5/5 and comments that the songs doesn't have the "instant appeal" and "lasting quality" of the songs in The Beginning but writes, "Overall, this is a better than the good score that will in all probability be perfect for the film." Vikram Venkateswaran of BloombergQuint claims that the songs are "infinitely better" than that of The Beginning and writes, "In keeping with the theme of the movie, the songs are simple, yet grand. The arrangement is devoid of unnecessary frills." Prachi Kulkarni of India writes, "The audio juke box... will make you feel the wholeness of the film way before you see it on the silver screen." Apoorva Nijhara of Pink Villa gave it a rating of 85/100 and writes, "From the setting of the musical arrangements to the singers, everything is just perfect."

See also 

 Baahubali 2: The Conclusion
 Baahubali: Music from the Motion Picture 
 Baahubali (franchise)

References

2017 soundtrack albums
Telugu film soundtracks
M. M. Keeravani soundtracks
Baahubali (franchise)
Hindi film soundtracks